The Shadow Secretary of State for Climate Change and Net Zero is a post in the Official Opposition Shadow Cabinet. The Shadow Secretary originally helped hold the Secretary of State for Energy and Climate Change and junior ministers to account and is the lead spokesperson on energy and climate change issues for his or her party. The post currently holds the Secretary of State for Energy Security and Net Zero to account in Parliament.

A previous Official Opposition post of Shadow Secretary of State for Energy existed until the Department of Energy was merged into the Department of Trade and Industry (DTI) in 1992. In 2008, the Department for Energy and Climate Change was split from the DTI's successor department, effectively reviving the former department and the need for an Opposition shadow.

Following Theresa May's appointment as Prime Minister in July 2016, the department was disbanded and merged with the Department for Business, Innovation and Skills to form the Department for Business, Energy and Industrial Strategy, with the consequent ending of this shadow post.

It was revived during the Shadow Cabinet of Keir Starmer and given to Ed Miliband, the former Labour Leader, who was then serving as Shadow Secretary of State for Business, Energy and Industrial Strategy before his appointment.

Shadow Secretary of State for Energy (1974–1992)

Shadow Secretary of State for Energy and Climate Change (2008–2016)

Shadow Secretary of State for Climate Change and Net Zero (2021-present)

See also
 Official Opposition frontbench

Official Opposition (United Kingdom)
1975 establishments in the United Kingdom
2016 disestablishments in the United Kingdom